The XIV Corps of the Grande Armée was a French military formation that existed for several months during the Napoleonic Wars. The corps was organized in the summer of 1813 and Marshal Laurent Gouvion Saint-Cyr was appointed as its commander. The formation was made up of four French infantry divisions, one cavalry division, and supporting artillery. The XIV Corps was stationed near Dresden to watch the passes of the Erzgebirge Mountains, which were the border between the hostile Austrian Empire and the allied Kingdom of Saxony. Saint-Cyr's corps played a major role in Emperor Napoleon I's victory at the Battle of Dresden in late August. Since it was assigned to garrison Dresden, the XIV Corps missed the Battle of Leipzig in October. Isolated after Napoleon's decisive defeat at Leipzig, the unit endured the Siege of Dresden which ended in November with a French surrender.

Order of battle

Dresden, 1813
XIV Corps: Marshal Laurent Gouvion Saint-Cyr
 42nd Division: General of Division Pierre-Louis Dupas
 9th Light Infantry Regiment
 10th Light Infantry Regiment
 11th Light Infantry Regiment
 12th Light Infantry Regiment
 39th Line Infantry Regiment
 40th Line Infantry Regiment
 43rd Line Infantry Regiment
 63rd Line Infantry Regiment
 96th Line Infantry Regiment
 43rd Division: General of Division Michel Marie Claparède
 27th Light Infantry Regiment
 29th Light Infantry Regiment
 27th Line Infantry Regiment
 45th Line Infantry Regiment
 65th Line Infantry Regiment
 95th Line Infantry Regiment
 100th Line Infantry Regiment
 103rd Line Infantry Regiment
 44th Division: General of Division Pierre Berthezène
 8th Light Infantry Regiment (2 battalions)
 16th Light Infantry Regiment (1 battalion)
 18th Light Infantry Regiment (1 battalion)
 24th Line Infantry Regiment
 39th Line Infantry Regiment
 50th Line Infantry Regiment
 54th Line Infantry Regiment
 64th Line Infantry Regiment
 75th Line Infantry Regiment
 79th Line Infantry Regiment
 45th Division: General of Division Louis-Nicolas de Razout
 6th Light Infantry Regiment
 17th Light Infantry Regiment
 5th Line Infantry Regiment
 8th Line Infantry Regiment
 11th Line Infantry Regiment
 28th Line Infantry Regiment
 32nd Line Infantry Regiment
 60th Line Infantry Regiment
 Cavalry elements:
 14th Hussar and Italian Chasseurs-à-Cheval Regiments
 7th and 8th Chevau-léger Lancer Regiments
 16th Polish Cavalry Regiment
 Other infantry elements:
 21st, 25th, and 26th Light Infantry Regiments
 34th, 37th, 58th, 76th, 79th, and 81st Line Infantry Regiments
 5th, 6th, and 7th Neapolitan Line Infantry Regiments 
 13th Polish Line Infantry Regiment

Source:

References

GAI14